ABM Shahjahan (-8 May 2018) is a Jatiya Party (Ershad) politician and the former Member of Parliament of Bogra-3. He was the organizer of the Liberation War of Bangladesh.

Career
Shahjahan was a founding member of the Jatiya Samajtantrik Dal (JSD) and General Secretary of the Central Committee. He later joined the Jatiya Party and served as a presidium member and secretary general.

He was elected to parliament from Bogra-3 as a Jatiya Samajtantrik Dal (Siraj) candidate in 1986. He was elected to parliament from Bogra-3 as a Jatiya Party candidate in 1988. He is a former State Minister.

He was the Director of the Board of Directors of Janata Bank Limited and the chairman of the Board of Directors of Rupali Bank Limited.

He lost the 5th Jatiya Sangsad elections of 1991, 7th Jatiya Sangsad elections of 12 June 1996 and the 8th Jatiya Sangsad of 2001 from the same constituency with the nomination of Jatiya Party.

Death
Ahmed died on 8 May 2018.

References

Jatiya Party politicians
2018 deaths
4th Jatiya Sangsad members
3rd Jatiya Sangsad members
1948 births
University of Rajshahi alumni